This is a list of some onshore wind farms (more than 1 turbine) in England. This information is gathered from multiple Internet sources, primarily the UK Wind Energy Database from RenewableUK (formerly BWEA), and The Wind Power's database. The name of the wind farm is the name used by the energy company when referring to the farm and is usually related to the name of the physical location, e.g. hill, moor, fell, down etc. or the name of the agricultural farm for the smaller installations on property owned by farmers. The "wind farm" part is implied and hence removed for clarity in most cases. Wind farms are listed alphabetically under the county that they are located in.

Notes

References

Wind farms in England
Wind
United Kingdom